Fei-Fei Li (born 1976) is a Chinese-American computer scientist who is known for establishing ImageNet, the dataset that enabled rapid advances in computer vision in the 2010s.

She is the Sequoia Capital Professor of Computer Science at Stanford University and former board director at Twitter. Li is a Co-Director of the Stanford Institute for Human-Centered Artificial Intelligence, and a Co-Director of the Stanford Vision and Learning Lab. She served as the director of the Stanford Artificial Intelligence Laboratory (SAIL) from 2013 to 2018.

In 2017, she co-founded AI4ALL, a nonprofit organization working to increase diversity and inclusion in the field of artificial intelligence. Her research expertise includes artificial intelligence (AI), machine learning, deep learning, computer vision and cognitive neuroscience.

Li was elected a member of the National Academy of Engineering (NAE) in 2020 for contributions in building large knowledge bases for machine learning and visual understanding. She is also a member of the National Academy of Medicine (NAM), and American Academy of Arts and Sciences (AAAS).

Early life and education
Li was born in Beijing, China in 1976 and grew up in Chengdu. When she was 12, her father moved to the US; when she was 15, she and her mother joined him in Parsippany-Troy Hills, New Jersey. She graduated from Parsippany High School in 1995, where she was inducted to the Hall of Fame of Parsippany High School in 2017.

Li majored in physics but also studied computer science and engineering as an undergraduate student at Princeton University, from where she graduated with high honors with an A.B. in physics and certificates in applied and computational mathematics and engineering physics in 1999. Li completed her senior thesis, titled "Auditory Binaural Correlogram Difference: A New Computational Model for Huggins Dichotic Pitch", under the supervision of Professor of Electrical Engineering Bradley Dickinson. During her years at Princeton, she returned home most weekends so that she could work in her parents' dry-cleaning store.

Li then pursued graduate studies at the California Institute of Technology, where she received a Ph.D. in electrical engineering in 2005. Li completed her dissertation, titled "Visual Recognition: Computational Models and Human Psychophysics", under the primary supervision of Pietro Perona and secondary supervision of Christof Koch. Her graduate studies were supported by the National Science Foundation Graduate Research Fellowship and The Paul & Daisy Soros Fellowships for New Americans.

Career 
From 2005 to August 2009, Li was an assistant professor in the Electrical and Computer Engineering Department at University of Illinois Urbana-Champaign and Computer Science Department at Princeton University, respectively. She joined Stanford in 2009 as an assistant professor, and was promoted to associate professor with tenure in 2012, and then full professor in 2017. At Stanford, Li served as the director of Stanford Artificial Intelligence Lab (SAIL) from 2013 to 2018. She became the founding co-director of Stanford's University-level initiative - the Human-Centered AI Institute, along with co-director Dr. John Etchemendy, former provost of Stanford University.

On her sabbatical from Stanford University from January 2017 to fall of 2018, Li joined Google Cloud as its Chief Scientist of AI/ML and Vice President. At Google, her team focused on democratizing AI technology and lowering the barrier for entrance to businesses and developers, including the developments of products like AutoML.

In September 2017, Google secured a contract from the Department of Defense called Project Maven, which aimed to use AI techniques to interpret images captured by drone cameras. Google told employees who protested the company's work on Project Maven that their role was "specifically scoped to be for non-offensive purposes." In June 2018, Google told employees it would not seek renewal of the contract. In internal emails which were later leaked to reporters, Li expressed enthusiasm for the Google Cloud role in Project Maven, but warned against mentioning its AI component, saying that military AI is linked in the public mind with the danger of autonomous weapons.  Asked about those leaked emails, Li told The New York Times, "I believe in human-centered AI to benefit people in positive and benevolent ways. It is deeply against my principles to work on any project that I think is to weaponize AI."

In the fall of 2018, Li left Google and returned to Stanford University to continue her professorship.

Li is also known for her nonprofit work as the co-founder and chairperson of nonprofit organization AI4ALL, whose mission is to educate the next generation of AI technologists, thinkers and leaders by promoting diversity and inclusion through human-centered AI principles. The program was created in collaboration with Melinda Gates and Jensen Huang.

Prior to establishing AI4ALL in 2017, Li and her former student Olga Russakovsky, currently an assistant professor in Princeton University, co-founded and co-directed the precursor program at Stanford called SAILORS (Stanford AI Lab OutReach Summers). SAILORS was an annual summer camp at Stanford dedicated to 9th grade high school girls in AI education and research, established in 2015 till it changed its name to AI4ALL @Stanford in 2017. In 2018, AI4ALL has successfully launched five more summer programs in addition to Stanford, including Princeton University, Carnegie Mellon University, Boston University, U. of California Berkeley, and Canada's Simon Fraser University.

Li has been described as an "AI pioneer" and a "researcher bringing humanity to AI".

Li was elected as a member of the American Academy of Arts and Sciences in 2021, the National Academy of Engineering, and the National Academy of Medicine in 2020.

In May 2020, Li joined the board of directors of Twitter as an independent director. On October 27, 2022, following Elon Musk’s purchase of the company, he removed Li and eight others from Twitter's nine-member board of directors, leaving himself as the sole director.

Research
Li works on AI, machine learning, computer vision, cognitive neuroscience and computational neuroscience. She has published more than 300 peer-reviewed research papers. Her work appears in computer science and neuroscience journals including Nature, Proceedings of the National Academy of Sciences, Journal of Neuroscience, Conference on Computer Vision and Pattern Recognition, International Conference on Computer Vision, Conference on Neural Information Processing Systems, European Conference on Computer Vision, International Journal of Computer Vision, and IEEE Transactions on Pattern Analysis and Machine Intelligence. Among her best-known work is the ImageNet project, which has revolutionized the field of large-scale visual recognition.

Li has led the team of students and collaborators to organize the international competition on ImageNet recognition tasks called ImageNet Large-Scale Visual Recognition Challenge (ILSVRC) between 2010 and 2017 in the academic community.

Li's research in computer vision contributed significantly to a line of work called Natural Scene Understanding, or later, Story-telling of images. She is a recognized for her work in this area by the International Association for Pattern Recognition in 2016. She delivered a talk on the main stage of TED in Vancouver in 2015, and has since then been viewed more than 2 million times.

In recent years, Fei-Fei Li's research work expanded to AI and Healthcare, collaborating closely with Stanford Medical School professor Arnold Milstein. She has also worked on improving bias in image recognition, for instance by removing concepts with low imageability from ImageNet.

Teaching 
She teaches the Stanford course CS231n on "Convolutional Neural Networks for Visual Recognition", whose 2015 version was previously online at Coursera. She has also taught CS131, an introductory class on computer vision.

Selected honors and awards 
1999 Paul and Daisy Soros Fellowship for New Americans
2006 Microsoft Research New Faculty Fellowship 
2009 NSF CAREER Award 
2010 Best Paper Honorable Mention, IEEE Conference on Computer Vision and Pattern Recognition (CVPR) 
2011 Fellow, Alfred P. Sloan Fellowship
2015 One of the Leading Global Thinkers of 2015, Foreign Policy 
 2016 IEEE PAMI Mark Everingham Prize [reference link]
2016 J.K. Aggarwal Prize, International Association for Pattern Recognition (IAPR) 
 2016 One of the 40 “The great immigrants,” Carnegie Foundation 
 2017 WITI@UC Athena Award for Academic Leadership, University of California 
2017 One of Seven Women in Technology honorees, Elle Magazine 
 2018 Elected as ACM Fellow for "contributions in building large knowledge bases for machine learning and visual understanding"
 2018 "America's Top 50 Women In Tech" by Forbes
2018 U.S. Congressional hearing by Subcommittee on Research and Technology & Subcommittee on Energy 
2019 Technical Leadership Abie Award Winner, AnitaB.org
2019 She was recognized as one of the BBC's 100 women.
2020 Elected member of the National Academy of Engineering
2020 Elected member of the National Academy of Medicine
2020 Distinguished Alumni Award Winner of California Institute of Technology
2020 Member of the Council on Foreign Relations (CFR) 
2021 ACM Fellow
2021 Elected member of the American Academy of Arts and Sciences

Books
Li contributed one chapter to Architects of Intelligence: The Truth About AI from the People Building it (2018) by the American futurist Martin Ford.

References

External links
 
 

1976 births
21st-century American scientists
American nonprofit executives
American science writers
American women academics
American women computer scientists
American computer scientists
American writers of Chinese descent
BBC 100 Women
Businesspeople from New Jersey
California Institute of Technology alumni
Chinese emigrants to the United States
Computer vision researchers
Educators from Beijing
Fellows of the Association for Computing Machinery
Living people
Machine learning researchers
Parsippany High School alumni
People from Parsippany-Troy Hills, New Jersey
Princeton University alumni
Princeton University faculty
Scientists from Beijing
Sloan Research Fellows
Stanford University Department of Computer Science faculty
University of Illinois Urbana-Champaign faculty
Women nonprofit executives
Writers from Beijing
Writers from New Jersey
21st-century American women
Members of the National Academy of Medicine
Directors of Twitter, Inc.